C/2000 W1 (Utsunomiya–Jones) is a long-period comet from the Oort cloud discovered on November 18, 2000, by Syogo Utsunomiya and Albert F. A. L. Jones. The comet reached up to apparent magnitude 5.5, but was only 27 degrees from the Sun in mid-December 2000.

The comet has an observation arc of 58 days allowing a reasonable estimate of the orbit. Though the near-perihelion orbit solution shows the comet to be on a hyperbolic trajectory, the orbit of a long-period comet is properly obtained when the osculating orbit is computed at an epoch after leaving the planetary region and is calculated with respect to the center of mass of the Solar System. Using JPL Horizons, the barycentric orbital elements for epoch 2020-Jan-01 generate a semi-major axis of 835 AU, an aphelion distance of 1670 AU, and a period of approximately 24,000 years.

C/2000 W1 came to perihelion on 26 December 2000 when it passed  from the Sun. It was last observed in February–March 2001 when it faded suddenly and probably disintegrated.

References

External links 
 Orbital simulation from JPL (Java) / Horizons Ephemeris
 C/2000 W1 ( Utsunomiya-Jones ) – Seiichi Yoshida @ aerith.net

Non-periodic comets
20001118